Elisa Lispector (born as Leah Pinkhasovna Lispector; July 24, 1911, Savran, Podolia – January 6, 1989, Rio de Janeiro) was a Brazilian novelist.

She was the older sister of Clarice Lispector. The sisters' birthplace, Podolia, Russian Empire.

Bibliography

Novels
 Além da fronteira (Cia. Editora Leitura, 1945) - Across the Border. Reprinted by José Olympio Editora, 1988)
 No Exílio (Editora Pongetti, 1945) - In Exile. Reprinted by Ebrasa, 1971. Translated into the French (En exil), Éditions Des Femmes, 1987).
 Ronda solitária (A Noite Editora, 1954) - Solitary Walk.
 O muro de pedras (José Olympio Editora, 1962) - The Stone Wall
 O dia mais longo de Thereza (Gráfica Record Editora, 1965) - Thereza's Longest Day.
 A última porta (Editora Documentário, 1975) - The Last Door
 Corpo a corpo (Edições Antares, 1983) - Body to Body

Stories
 Sangue no sol (Ebrasa, 1970). Blood on the Sun.
 Inventário (Rocco, 1977). Inventory.
 O tigre de Bengala (José Olympio Editora, 1985). Includes some works previously published in Sangue no sol and Inventário.

References

1911 births
1989 deaths
Brazilian women novelists
Brazilian Jews
Naturalized citizens of Brazil
Brazilian people of Ukrainian-Jewish descent
20th-century Brazilian women writers
20th-century Brazilian novelists
Emigrants from the Russian Empire to Brazil